In Unix computing, Blackbox is a free and open-source stacking window manager for the X Window System.

Blackbox has specific design goals, and some functionality is provided only through other applications. One example is the bbkeys hotkey application.

Blackbox is written in C++ and contains completely original code. It was created by Bradley T. Hughes and is available under the MIT License. Blackbox has compliance with the Extended Window Manager Hints specification.

The original author seems to have ceased updating the repository with the exception of a minor fix of compilation problems in 2015, leaving the last original version at 0.70.1. However an actively maintained fork by Brian Bidulock has been picked up by several Linux distributions in its place, and it is featured in pkgsrc. Despite that, some other Linux distributions still use the original source code, as does FreeBSD.

Features 
Features of the Blackbox window manager include:
 A stacking window manager
 Written in C++
 Freely available under the MIT license
 Compliance with the Extended Window Manager Hints Specification
 Title bars have minimize, maximize, and close buttons
 Support for simple themes
 Support for color changes
 No support for desktop shortcuts
 Compatibility with both KDE and GNOME

Related projects 
There are a number of other window manager forks of Blackbox:

 Fluxbox
 Hackedbox
 Openbox (until version 3.0)

Windows shell replacements 
Although they do not share the same codebase, these projects are also inspired by Blackbox.

 BB4Win (the first and most prominent clone/port of Blackbox on Windows)
 bbLean 
 xoblite (has releases from 2021)
 bbZero (a branch of bbLean)

See also 

 Comparison of X window managers

References

External links 
 
 Blackbox at Free Software Directory

Articles containing video clips
Free software programmed in C++
Free X window managers
Software using the MIT license